Club Deportivo Aluvión is a Spanish football team based in Cascante, in the autonomous community of Navarre. Founded in 1922 it plays in Regional Preferente, holding home games at Campo de Fútbol Malón de Echaide, with a capacity of 3,000 seats.

Season to season

12 seasons in Tercera División

External links
Official website 
Futbolme.com profile 
navarrafutbolclic.com profile 

Football clubs in Navarre
Association football clubs established in 1922
Divisiones Regionales de Fútbol clubs
1922 establishments in Spain